Kanksa is a census town and a gram panchayat in the Kanksa CD block in the Durgapur subdivision of the Paschim Bardhaman district in the Indian state of West Bengal.

History
The name Kankasha comes from the name of Sadgope king Kanka Sen Rai.Who fought in the Battlefield against Bakhtiar's commander Saiyad Bukhari.As per Peterson’s District Gazeteer of 1910, the south-western extremity of the Sadgop kingdom of Gopbhum was held by two kinglings, probably merely cadets of the house of Gopbhum, at Bharatpur and Kankeswar or Kanksa.

Kanksa is home to one of the oldest police stations in the area. In 1847, when Raniganj was constituted as a separate subdivision of Bardhaman district, it had three police stations under its jurisdiction - Raniganj, Kanksa and Neamatpur.

The Rarheswar Shiva temple in Arra, within Kanksa police station area, is an old one of the "rekh deul" category. There also is a suggestion that there possibly was an ancient city at this place.

Geography

Location

Urbanisation
According to the 2011 census, 79.22% of the population of the Durgapur subdivision was urban and 20.78% was rural. The sole municipal corporation in the Durgapur subdivision is located at Durgapur and the subdivision has 38 (+1 partly) census towns (partly presented in the map alongside; all places marked on the map are linked in the full-screen map).

Gram panchayats
Gram panchayats under Kanksa Panchayat Samiti are: Bidbihar, Molandighi, Gopalpur, Bonkati, Tilakchandrapur, Kanksa and Amlajore.

Civic administration

Police station
Kanksa police station has jurisdiction over the Kanksa CD block. The area covered is 280 km2. In the police set up Kanksa PS is under the Subdivisional Police Officer of Bardhaman Sadar North subdivision.

CD block HQ
The Headquarters of Kanksa CD block is at Kanksa.

Demographics
According to the 2011 Census of India, Kanksa had a total population of 23,789 of which 12,406 (52%) were males and 11,383 (48%) were females. Population in the age range of 0–6 years was 2,577. The total number of literate persons in Kanksa was 17,992 (84.82% of the population over 6 years).

Infrastructure

According to the District Census Handbook 2011, Bardhaman, Kanksa covered an area of 8.66 km2. Among the civic amenities, it had 18 km roads, with both open and covered drains, the protected water-supply involved overhead tank, tap water from treated source, hand pump. It had 1,892 domestic electric connections. Among the medical facilities, it had 1 charitable hospital/ nursing home, 5 medicine shops. Among the educational facilities it had were 12 primary schools, 3 middle schools, 3 secondary schools, 1 senior secondary school. Among the social, recreational, cultural facilities it had 1 cinema theatre, 1 auditorium/ community hall, 1 public library, 1 reading room. It had the branch offices of 3 nationalised banks and 1 co-operative bank.

Transport
State Highway 14 passes through Kanksa. The Dubrajpur-Ilambazar sector of State Highway 14 is part of Panagarh–Morgram Highway.

Education
Kanksa has six primary, one secondary and two higher secondary schools.

Kanksa High School is a Bengali-medium coeducational institution established in 1942. It has facilities for teaching from class V to class XII. The school has 1 computer, a library with 3,000 books and a playground.

Kanksa Girls’ High School is a Bengali-medium girls-only institution established in 1963. It has facilities for teaching from class V to class XII. The school has 2 computers, a library with 250 books and a playground.

Healthcare
Panagarh Rural Hospital, with 30 beds, at Panagarh, is the major government medical facility in the Kanksa CD block.

References

Cities and towns in Paschim Bardhaman district